NRDC may refer to:

Natural Resources Defense Council, an American environmental group
National Research Development Corporation, a UK company set up to license government research to industrial partners
NRDC Equity Partners, an American retail holding company
NATO Rapid Deployable Corps – Italy, an Italian military formation.

See also 
 National Research Development Corporation v Commissioner of Patents, a 1959 Australian patent law case
 NDRC (disambiguation)